Eduard Hayrapetyan (born September 5, 1949) is an Armenian composer of contemporary classical music.

Biography 
He was born in Yerevan, Armenia, on September 5, 1949. He first studied composition at the Melikian Music College under Grigor Akhinian (1966–68) and then under Grigor Yeghiazarian at the Yerevan Komitas State Conservatory (1968–73). He joined the Armenian Composers Union in 1976.

To date he has received the following awards and medals:

 1993 – Prize of Armenian Composers Union for Concerto No. 3 ”Annunciation” for cello and chamber string orchestra
 1993 - Aram Khachaturian Prize of Ministry of Culture of Armenia and Armenian Composers Union for Vocal cycle “…nur ein kurzes Trennen” for voice and 13 instruments after Joseph von Eichendorff
 2008 – Vahan Tekeyan Prize of Tekeyan Cultural Union for Double Concerto for violin, viola and chamber string orchestra
 2009 – Prize of World Armenian Congress and Armenian Composers Union for “Narcissus” Chamber Symphony
 2009 – Gold Medal of Ministry of Culture of Armenia

Hayrapetyan participated at Budapest International Festival in 1986, Zagreb Music Biennale in 1991, Sweden Festival in 1992, Greece Festival in 1998, “Prima Vista” festivals in Odessa in 1998 and 1999.
His compositions were performed in Armenia, Georgia, Russia, Ukraine, Baltic States, The Czech Republic, Sweden, Canada, Germany, USA, Lebanon, Switzerland, France. His first Symphony was premiered in Poland.
In 1999 and 2000 he was a Grant holder of Studio International “Denkmalschmiede Hoefgen’
(Germany).

Among Hayrapetyan’s major works are the ballet “Tram “Wish”, 1991, (after T.Williams “A Street Car Named Desire”); Three Symphonies (1985, 1987, 2000); “Oratorio-1915” (documentary texts) for speaker, soloists, chorus and symphony orchestra (1977); Concertos for: Violin(7); Viola(3); Cello(3); Flute; Oboe; Clarinet; Bassoon; Double Concerto for Violin and Viola; Percussion; String Quartets(5); Works for Chorus; Cycles of Songs based on poems by Byron, Eichendorff, George, Rilke, Metsarentz, Hakob Mowses, Trakl as well as Sonatas for various instruments.

World Premieres during 1998–2009

Symphony No.3  “The Big Fiery Butterfly” for the full Symphony orchestra,2000,53’30", performed by Armenian Philharmonic Orchestra,  2001
“The Lost Balloon” for chamber string orchestra,1998,15', performed by National Chamber Orchestra of Armenia (NCOA), 1998
“From Afar” for duduk and chamber string orchestra,1999,17', performed by NCOA,  2000
“With Ecstasy…” for mixed chorus and chamber string orchestra (words by Misak Metsarents, in Armenian), 2001,  15', performed by Armenian Chamber Choir and NCOA,   2003
Concerto No3 “Avetum”(“Annunciation”) for cello and chamber string orchestra,2004,30', performed  by “Naregatsi” Chamber Music Society,  2008
Double Concerto for violin, viola and chamber string orchestra,1997,27’, performed by “Alan Hovhannes Chamber Orchestra”,  2007
String quartet  #4 “Theater music”,  1994,   17’30", performed by “Harmonies of the World” Ukraine,  2005
“I tell thee, minstrel, I must weep…”  song cycle for voice and 10 instruments (words by George Gordon Byron, in English), 1990, 23’, performed by Collegium Musicum Armenicum,  2002
“Artun” (“The Awakening”)  for soprano, piano and chamber string orchestra (words by Misak Metsarents, in Armenian), 1998, 8’, performed  by  NCOA, 2000
“Narzis” Chamber Symphony,   2008,   31’13", performed by “Alan Hovhannes” Chamber Orchestra, 2008
“To Be” Three Poems for mixed chorus (words by Misak Metsarents, in Armenian, 1.Irikune (The Evening), 2.Hove (The Breeze), 3.Hyughe (The Sanctuary), 2006, 20’, performed by Armenian Chamber Choir, 2008

Compositions

Ballet:

“Tram “Wish” after T. Williams “A Street Car Named Desire” in 2 acts, 1991, 60’

Orchestral:

Symphony  #1,  1985,  28’30",
Symphony  #2,  1987,  27',
Symphony  #3, “The Big Fiery Butterfly”, 2000, 53’30",
“Narcissus” Chamber Symphony,  1978, 20’, Rev. 2008, 31’13",
“The River”  (after T.S. Eliot) for symphony orchestra, 1994, 13’,
“Theater Music” for chamber string orchestra, 1996, 17’30",
“The Lost Balloon” for chamber string orchestra, 1998,15’,
“From Afar” for duduk  & chamber string orchestra, 1999, 17’

Choral:

“Oratorio-1915” (documentary texts) for speaker, mezzo, bass, mixed chorus and symphony orchestra (in Armenian),  1977, 38’
“Seven peaceful words” Cantata for mixed chorus (words by Hakob Movses, in Armenian), 1991, 14’
“Our Father” for mixed chorus (in Armenian),  1998, 5’
“With Ecstasy...”  for mixed chorus and chamber string orchestra (words by Misak Metsarents, in Armenian), 2001, 15’
“Intimate Visions”  Two choral songs (words by Misak Metsarents, in Armenian), 7', for children chorus, 2002, for mixed chorus, 2004
“To Be” Three Poems for mixed chorus (words by Misak Metsarents, in Armenian), 2006, 20’

Concertos:

Concerto for flute and chamber string orchestra,  1984,  17’30"
Concerto for oboe and  chamber orchestra,  1992,  18’
Concerto for clarinet and chamber orchestra,  1991,  17’
Concerto for bassoon and chamber orchestra,  1994, 18’
Concerto #1 for violin and chamber string orchestra,   1976–1980,  14’
Concerto #2 for violin and chamber string orchestra,   1980,  17’30"
Concerto #3 for violin and chamber orchestra,  1983,  22’
Concerto #4 for violin and symphony orchestra,  1986,  26’
Concerto #5 for violin and chamber orchestra,  1989,  27’
Concerto #6 for violin and chamber string orchestra,  1995,  22’
Concerto #7 for violin and chamber string  orchestra,2008, 22'
Concerto #1 for viola and chamber string orchestra,  1983,  Rev. 1995,  20’20"
Concerto #2 for viola and symphony orchestra,  1993,  28’
Concerto #3 for viola and chamber string orchestra,  2008,  25’
Concerto #1 for cello and symphony orchestra,  1981,  18’
Concerto #2 for cello and chamber orchestra,  1986,  20’
Concerto #3 “Avetum”(“Annunciation”) for cello and chamber string orchestra,1993,19’Rev. 2004,30’
Double Concerto for violin, viola and chamber string orchestra, 1997, 27’
“Marimba and Timpani” Concerto for percussion and chamber string orchestra,  2006,  20’

Chamber instrumental:

String quartet #1,  1983,  12’
String quartet #2,  1988,  18’
String quartet #3 “Quartet of Dreams”,  1992,  18’
String quartet #4 “Theater music”,  1994,  17’30"
String quartet #5,  2008,   20’
Trio for violin, flute and clarinet,  1981,  Rev. 2003,  12’
Quartet for violin, viola, cello and piano,  1981,  Rev. 1998,  18’
Suite for flute, five groups percussion and piano,  1976,  22’
“Konzertstucke” for chamber ensemble,  1982,  10’
“Triad” for piano,  1970,  7’
“Intervals” for piano,  1973,  10’
Sonatina  for violins ensemble,  1974,  10’
“Five pieces” for violin and piano,  1977,  5’30"
“Five pieces” for wind quintet,  1978,  5’
“Fantasy” for violin solo,  1979,  9’
“The obtained song” for viola solo,  1993,  7’
“Dialogue” for violin and piano,  1995,  9’30"
“Above the Hills” for cello solo,  2000,  6’
“Postskriptum” for flute solo,  2004,  8
“Meeting” for two contrabasses,  2005,  7’

Sonatas:

Sonata for flute and piano,  2005,  15’
Sonata for oboe and piano,  2005,  12’
Sonata for clarinet and piano,  2005,  21’
Sonata for bassoon and piano,  2005,  15’
Sonata for piano,  1979,  14’
Sonata #1 for violin and piano,  1972,  12’
Sonata #2 for violin and piano,  1980,  12’
Sonata #3 for violin and piano,  1982,  13’30"
Sonata #4 for violin and piano,  1992,  14’
Sonata for violin solo,  2004,  10’
Sonata for two violins and piano,  1988,  13’
Sonata #1 for viola and piano,  1980,  13’30"
Sonata #2 for viola and piano,  1983,  14’
Sonata #3 for viola and piano,  1986,  14’
Sonata #4 for viola and piano,  2006,  19’50"
Sonata #1 for cello and piano,  1980,  12’
Sonata #2 for cello and piano,  1984,  16’
Sonata for cello solo,  1993,  Rev.2000, 12’

Vocal:

“Moon Sign” solo cantata for voice and piano (words by Roman Kim, in Russian),  1981,  12’
“…nur ein kurzes Trennen”  song cycle  for voice and 13 instruments (words by Joseph von Eichendorff, in German),  1989,  26’
“I tell thee, minstrel, I must weep…”  song cycle for voice and 10 instruments (words by George Gordon Byron, in English),  1990,  23’
“Der geheime Sternenfall”  song cycle for soprano and string quartet (words by Reiner Maria Rilke, in German),  1990,  12’
“…This twilight’s pearl-shade”  three songs for soprano and piano (words by Misak Metsarents, in Armenian),  1993,  10’
“Artun” (“The Awakenning”)  for soprano, piano and chamber string orchestra (words by Misak Metsarents, in Armenian),  1998,  8’
“Yuli – Schwermut”  three songs for soprano and piano (words by Stefan George, in German),2003, 11’
“Der heilige Fremdling” song cycle for  voice and piano (words by Georg Trakl, in German), 2008,  15’

Sources

S.Sarkisian: ‘O tvorchestve molodikh kompositorov Armenii’ (On the creative work of young Armenian composers), Muzikal’naya kul’tura bratskich respublik SSSR,  ed. G.Kon’kova,Vol.I (Kiev, 1982), pp. 147–67
B.Banas: ‘Muzika ormianska’ Trybuna polska (12 November 1986)
A.Arevshatyan: ‘Muzika dlya kamerno-orkestrovikh sostavov: 70-80-e godi (Music for chamber and orchestral casts: the 70s-80s), Armyanskoye iskusstvo na sovremenom etape, ed. G.Geodakyan (Yerevan, 1987), pp.157-8
S.Sarkisian: ‘Mlodzi kompozytorzy Armenii’ (The young composers of Armenia), Ruch muzyczny, no.8 (Warszawa,1987), pp. 18–19
S.Sarkisian: ‘Nostal’gicheskiy romantism Eduarda Ayrapetyana’ (Eduard Hayrapetian’s nostalgic romanticism), Muzikal’naya academia, no.2 (Moscow, 2000), pp. 49–51
A.Arevshatyan: ‘Egherne ev hay ardi erazhshtoutyoune’ (The Genocide and Contemporary Armenian Music), Erazhshtakan Hayastan N2 (17) 2005
M.Rukhkian: ‘Ritsar instrumental, nogo kontserta‘ (Kniqht of  instrumental concerto), Golos Armenii (9 July 2009)

External links
 SAMPLES OF EDUARD HAYRAPETYAN'S MUSIC 

Armenian composers
Musicians from Yerevan
Living people
1949 births